Eresia erysice is a butterfly of the Nymphalinae family. It was described by Carl Geyer in 1832. It is found in French Guiana and Brazil.

Subspecies
Eresia erysice erysice
Eresia erysice etesiae (Hall, 1929) (French Guiana, northern Brazil)

References

 Eresia erysice at Insecta.pro

Butterflies described in 1832
Melitaeini
Lepidoptera of French Guiana
Fauna of Brazil
Nymphalidae of South America
Taxa named by Carl Geyer